Capps is a surname, and may refer to:

 Charles Capps (1934–2014), American Christian preacher
 Charlie Capps (politician) (1925–2009), American politician
Edward Capps Sr. (1866–1950), American professor, Colonel, and diplomat
 Edwin M. Capps (1860–1938), American politician
 Hahn William Capps (1903–1998), American entomologist
 J. Russell Capps (1931-2020), American politician
 Lois Capps (born 1938), American politician
 Marian Palmer Capps (1901–2001), American mathematician
 Matt Capps (born 1983), American baseball player
 Steve Capps, American programmer
 Walter Capps (1934–1997), American politician
 Washington L. Capps (1864–1935), American naval officer

See also
 Capp (disambiguation)